Novair LLC is an Armenian carrier based at Zvartnots International Airport in Yerevan, Armenia.

History
The airline was founded on 23 October 2020, as a subsidiary of Atlantis Armenian Airlines, subsequently absorbing the regional fleet consisting of one Let L-410 Turbolet. The airline has assumed regional flights to Batumi and was to take over flights to Kapan in the near future. However this plan was abandoned in 2021.

Destinations

Fleet
The Novair fleet consists of the following aircraft (as of December 2020):

See also
 List of airports in Armenia
 List of the busiest airports in Armenia
 Transport in Armenia

References

External links
 Facebook page

Airlines of Armenia
Airlines established in 2016
Armenian companies established in 2016